Valley Mills is a city in Bosque and McLennan counties in central Texas, United States. The population was 1,203 at the 2010 census.

The McLennan County portion of Valley Mills is part of the Waco Metropolitan Statistical Area.

History
Valley Mills was named for a flour mill established on the banks of the Bosque River in 1867 by Dr. E.P. Booth and Asbury Stegall.

In 1881, the Gulf, Colorado and Santa Fe Railway laid tracks a mile south of the community, across the Bosque River. Merchants, hoping to benefit from the railroad, began moving their stores across the river, to the tracks.

On February 17, 1882, a cyclone (tornado) hit the new townsite, destroying a large number of buildings.  Nevertheless, the remaining residents from the community's original site moved across the river and rebuilt their homes. Thus, by the end of 1882 Valley Mills had extended into McLennan County.

Dairy farming and stock raising were the principal industries of the community. By 1900, however, the railroad and the nearby Chisholm Trail had made Valley Mills a prosperous retail and trading center for Bosque and McLennan counties. The community's population reached 855 by 1905. Like many rural Texas communities, Valley Mills declined during the 1930s. Following World War II, however, as farm prices increased and ranching prospered, the economy grew, and the population, which had declined to 803 by 1937, increased to 1,037 by the mid-1950s. During the next three decades Valley Mills maintained its position as a leading retail market and shipping point for Bosque and McLennan counties.

The town was hit by an F-5 tornado on May 6, 1973, nearly 20 years after the infamous 1953 Waco Tornado, and despite its F-5 rating, there were no deaths in the Valley Mills tornado.

In 1984, it had a newspaper, a municipal airport, more than 25 businesses, several dairy farms and ranches, and a population of 1,236. A new school was opened in 1988; it and four churches were the social centers of the community. In 1990, the population was 1,085. In 2010, the population was 1,203.

Demographics

2020 census

As of the 2020 United States census, there were 1,229 people, 468 households, and 371 families residing in the city.

2000 census
As of the census of 2000, there were 1,123 people, 430 households, and 301 families residing in the city. The population density was 1,601.2 people per square mile (619.4/km). There were 487 housing units at an average density of 694.4 per square mile (268.6/km). The racial makeup of the city was 86.73% White, 4.99% African American, 0.36% Native American, 0.27% Asian, 5.97% from other races, and 1.69% from two or more races. Hispanic or Latino of any race were 8.73% of the population.

There were 430 households, out of which 33.3% had children under the age of 18 living with them, 52.8% were married couples living together, 11.9% had a female householder with no husband present, and 30.0% were non-families. 28.6% of all households were made up of individuals, and 15.8% had someone living alone who was 65 years of age or older. The average household size was 2.49 and the average family size was 3.03.

In the city, the population was spread out, with 27.0% under the age of 18, 6.5% from 18 to 24, 25.1% from 25 to 44, 20.7% from 45 to 64, and 20.7% who were 65 years of age or older. The median age was 38 years. For every 100 females, there were 85.3 males. For every 100 females age 18 and over, there were 76.3 males.

The median income for a household in the city was $32,115, and the median income for a family was $39,659. Males had a median income of $35,000 versus $18,125 for females. The per capita income for the city was $15,062. About 6.7% of families and 9.3% of the population were below the poverty line, including 7.7% of those under age 18 and 17.7% of those age 65 or over.

Education

Valley Mills is served by the Valley Mills Independent School District and home to Valley Mills High School.

Notable people

 Donnie Sadler, Major League Baseball player
 Isaac Brock (supercentenarian) (died 1909), once claimed to be longest-lived American in history

Geography

Climate 
The climate in this area is characterized by hot, humid summers and generally mild to cool winters.  According to the Köppen Climate Classification system, Valley Mills has a humid subtropical climate, abbreviated "Cfa" on climate maps.

References

Cities in Bosque County, Texas
Cities in McLennan County, Texas
Cities in Texas